Bessie McCoy (1888 – August 16, 1931) was an Irish-American Vaudeville star best known for her 1908 hit song and dance routine "The Yama Yama Man", for which she became known as "The Yama Yama Girl". Her husband was the war correspondent Richard Harding Davis.

McCoy was born in Ireland as Elizabeth Genevieve McEvoy. Her mother and father were a vaudeville act known as McCoy and McEvoy, they were Irish clog dancers. Bessie, along with her sister, entered stage in their teens as chorus girls. She appeared in a number of Broadway musicals and made a breakthrough in the play "The Echo". She was given the "Yama Yama Man" song in the 1908 revue Three Twins.

She became famous for her lazy, husky singing while performing unusual acrobatic dance routines while dressed in a clowns pajama suit with a fools cap topped by a puff ball.

She met Harding Davis at this time, and they were married in 1912 when she was 24 years old. After Harding's early death in 1916 from a heart-attack, McCoy retired from stage work and lived in the Davis' Connecticut estate.

In 1931, while in France with her 16-year-old daughter Hope, she died suddenly after an emergency intestinal operation.

References

External links

 
 
 
 

1888 births
1931 deaths
Vaudeville performers
American stage actresses
Irish emigrants to the United States (before 1923)